The 2018–19 West Midlands (Regional) League season was the 119th in the history of the West Midlands (Regional) League (WMRL), a football competition in England which was formed in 1889. The league operates three divisions: the Premier Division, see below, at level 10 in the English football league system, Division One at level 11, and Division Two. The Premier Division is one of three divisions which feed into the Midland League Premier Division, the other two being the East Midlands Counties League and the Midland League's own Division One.

The provisional constitution for Step 5 and Step 6 divisions for 2018–19 was announced by the FA on 25 May 2018; the WM(R)L constitution was later ratified by the league at its AGM.

Premier Division

The Premier Division featured 16 clubs which competed in the division last season, along with four new clubs:
 Haughmond, relegated from the Midland League Premier Division
 Pershore Town, transferred from Midland League Division One
 Shawbury United, relegated from the Midland League Premier Division
 Wem Town, promoted from Division One

League table

References

2018-19
10